The dusky finless skate (Gurgesiella furvescens) is a species of fish in the family Gurgesiellidae. It is found in the western Pacific Ocean off Chile, Ecuador, and Peru. Its natural habitat is open seas.

References

Gurgesiella
Taxonomy articles created by Polbot
Fish described in 1959